Nepenthes ventricosa (from New Latin ventricosus "having a swelling on one side") is a tropical pitcher plant endemic to the Philippines, where it is a highland species, growing at an elevation of  above sea level. It has been recorded from the islands of Luzon, Panay, and Sibuyan.

Nepenthes ventricosa is very closely related to both N. burkei and N. sibuyanensis, but can be distinguished by a more waisted middle to the pitchers, a smaller mouth, and, generally, a thinner peristome.

Infraspecific taxa

Nepenthes ventricosa f. luteoviridis Hort. ex Y.Fukatsu (1999) nom.nud.

Natural hybrids
N. alata × N. ventricosa [=N. × ventrata]

References

Further reading

 Alejandro, G.J.D., J.P.C. Baysa, B.O.C. Lemana, G.M. Madulara, R.S. Madulid & D.A. Madulid 2007. Conspecificity of Nepenthes alata Blco. population found in Mt. Guisguis, Zambales inferred from Internal Transcribed Spacer (nrDNA) sequence data. Acta Manilana 55: 15–21. 
 Alejandro, G.J.D., R.S. Madulid & D.A. Madulid 2008. The utility of Internal Transcribed Spacer (nrDNA) sequence data for phylogenetic reconstruction in endemic Philippine Nepenthes L. (Nepenthaceae). The Philippine Scientist 45: 99–110. 
 Bauer, U., C.J. Clemente, T. Renner & W. Federle 2012. Form follows function: morphological diversification and alternative trapping strategies in carnivorous Nepenthes pitcher plants. Journal of Evolutionary Biology 25(1): 90–102. 
 Benz, M.J., E.V. Gorb & S.N. Gorb 2012. Diversity of the slippery zone microstructure in pitchers of nine carnivorous Nepenthes taxa. Arthropod-Plant Interactions 6(1): 147–158. 
 Beveridge, N.G.P., C. Rauch, P.J.A. Keßler, R.R. van Vugt & P.C. van Welzen 2013. A new way to identify living species of Nepenthes (Nepenthaceae): more data needed! Carnivorous Plant Newsletter 42(4): 122–128.
  Blanco, F.M. 1845. Nepenthes. In: Flora de Filipinas, segun el sistema sexual de Linneo. Segunda impresion, corregida y aumentada por el mismo autor. D. Miguel Sanchez, Manila. pp. 555–557. 
  Blume, C.L. 1852. Ord. Nepenthaceae. In: Museum Botanicum Lugduno-Batavum, sive stirpium exoticarum novarum vel minus cognitarum ex vivis aut siccis brevis expositio. Tom. II. Nr. 1. E.J. Brill, Lugduni-Batavorum. pp. 5–10.
 Bonhomme, V., H. Pelloux-Prayer, E. Jousselin, Y. Forterre, J.-J. Labat & L. Gaume 2011. Slippery or sticky? Functional diversity in the trapping strategy of Nepenthes carnivorous plants. New Phytologist 191(2): 545–554. 
 Buch, F., M. Rott, S. Rottloff, C. Paetz, I. Hilke, M. Raessler & A. Mithöfer 2012. Secreted pitfall-trap fluid of carnivorous Nepenthes plants is unsuitable for microbial growth. Annals of Botany 111(3): 375–383. 
 Clarke, C. 2013. What Can Tree Shrews Tell Us about the Effects of Climate Change on Pitcher Plants? [video] TESS seminars, 25 September 2013.
 Co, L. & W. Suarez 2012. Nepenthaceae. Co's Digital Flora of the Philippines.
 Duffield, R.M. & P. Sheridan 2007. Asian tiger mosquito, Aedes albopictus (Skuse) (Diptera: Culicidae), larvae in pitchers of Nepenthes ventricosa Blanco (Nepenthaceae) in Virginia. Proceedings of the Entomological Society of Washington 109(2): 489–492.
  Jarry-Desloges, R. 1903. Variétés nouvelles ou rares de Nepenthes. Le Jardin 17: 72.
 Jebb, M.H.P. & M.R. Cheek 1997. A skeletal revision of Nepenthes (Nepenthaceae). Blumea 42(1): 1–106.
 Kurup, R., A.J. Johnson, S. Sankar, A.A. Hussain, C.S. Kumar & S. Baby 2013. Fluorescent prey traps in carnivorous plants. Plant Biology 15(3): 611–615. 
 Macfarlane, J.M. 1927. The Philippine species of Nepenthes. The Philippine Journal of Science 33(2): 127–140.
  Mansur, M. 2001.  In: Prosiding Seminar Hari Cinta Puspa dan Satwa Nasional. Lembaga Ilmu Pengetahuan Indonesia, Bogor. pp. 244–253.
  McPherson, S. & T. Gronemeyer 2008. Die Nepenthesarten der Philippinen Eine Fotodokumentation. Das Taublatt 60(1): 34–78.
 Meimberg, H., P. Dittrich, G. Bringmann, J. Schlauer & G. Heubl 2000. Molecular phylogeny of Caryophyllidae s.l. based on matK sequences with special emphasis on carnivorous taxa. Plant Biology 2(2): 218–228. 
 Meimberg, H., A. Wistuba, P. Dittrich & G. Heubl 2001. Molecular phylogeny of Nepenthaceae based on cladistic analysis of plastid trnK intron sequence data. Plant Biology 3(2): 164–175. 
  Meimberg, H. 2002.  Ph.D. thesis, Ludwig Maximilian University of Munich, Munich.
 Meimberg, H. & G. Heubl 2006. Introduction of a nuclear marker for phylogenetic analysis of Nepenthaceae. Plant Biology 8(6): 831–840. 
 Merrill, E.D. 1905. Nepenthaceæ. In: A review of the identifications of the species described in Blanco's Flora de Filipinas. Bureau of Public Printing, Manila. p. 72.
 Merrill, E.D. 1918. Nepenthaceae. In: Species Blancoanae: a critical revision of the Philippine species of plants described by Blanco and by Llanos. Bureau of Printing, Manila. p. 160.
 Nerz, J., P. Mann, T. Alt & T. Smith 1998. Nepenthes sibuyanensis, a new Nepenthes from Sibuyan, a remote island of the Philippines. Carnivorous Plant Newsletter 27(1): 18–23.
 Renner, T. & C.D. Specht 2011. A sticky situation: assessing adaptations for plant carnivory in the Caryophyllales by means of stochastic character mapping. International Journal of Plant Sciences 172(7): 889–901. 
 Rottloff, S., R. Stieber, H. Maischak, F.G. Turini, G. Heubl & A. Mithöfer 2011. Functional characterization of a class III acid endochitinase from the traps of the carnivorous pitcher plant genus, Nepenthes. Journal of Experimental Botany 62(13): 4639–4647. 
 Shin, K.-S., S. Lee & B.J. Cha 2007. Suppression of phytopathogenic fungi by hexane extract of Nepenthes ventricosa x maxima leaf. Fitoterapia 78(7–8): 585–586. 
 Slack, A. 1979. Nepenthes ventricosa. In: Carnivorous Plants. Ebury Press, London. p. 85.
 Stephenson, P.& J. Hogan 2006. Cloning and characterization of a ribonuclease, a cysteine proteinase, and an aspartic proteinase from pitchers of the carnivorous plant Nepenthes ventricosa Blanco. International Journal of Plant Sciences 167(2): 239–248. 
 Thornhill, A.H., I.S. Harper & N.D. Hallam 2008. The development of the digestive glands and enzymes in the pitchers of three Nepenthes species: N. alata, N. tobaica, and N. ventricosa (Nepenthaceae). International Journal of Plant Sciences 169(5): 615–624. 

Carnivorous plants of Asia
ventricosa
Endemic flora of the Philippines
Plants described in 1837
Taxa named by Francisco Manuel Blanco